Ubykh, an extinct Northwest Caucasian language, has the largest consonant inventory of all documented languages that do not use clicks, and also has the most disproportional ratio of phonemic consonants to vowels. It has consonants in at least eight, perhaps nine, basic places of articulation and 29 distinct fricatives, 27 sibilants, and 20 uvulars, more than any other documented language. Some Khoisan languages, such as ǃXóõ, may have larger consonant inventories due to their extensive use of click consonants, although some analyses view a large proportion of the clicks in these languages as clusters, which would bring them closer into line with the Caucasian languages.

Consonants

Standard Ubykh Phonology 
Below is an International Phonetic Alphabet representation of the Standard Ubykh consonant inventory.

 Note the large number of basic series; Ubykh has basic consonants at nine places of articulation.
 The three postalveolar series have traditionally been called "postalveolar", "alveolo-palatal", and "retroflex", respectively, and have been transcribed with their associated symbols.
 There is no standard IPA notation for the laminal-closed postalveolar series. They are transcribed , etc. by Catford.
 The velar stops  and the labiodental fricative  are only found in Turkish and Circassian loanwords.
 Out of the labials, the fricatives  are labiodental, the others bilabial.

All but four of the 84 consonants are found in native vocabulary. The plain velars  and the voiced labiodental fricative  are found mainly in loans and onomatopoeia:  ('crow') from Turkish karga),  ('slat, batten') from Laz k'avari 'roofing shingle'),  ('estate, legacy') from Turkish vakıf),  ('the sound of glass breaking'). As well, the pharyngealised labial consonants  are almost exclusively noted in words where they are associated with another pharyngealised consonant (for instance,  'handful'), but are occasionally found outside this context (for example, the verb root  'to explode, to burst'). The frequency of consonants in Ubykh is quite variable; the phoneme  alone accounts for over 12% of all consonants encountered in connected text, due to the presence of the phoneme in the ergative and oblique singular and plural case suffixes, the third person singular and plural ergative verbal agreement prefix, the adverbial derivative suffix, the present and imperfect tense suffixes, and in suffixes denoting several non-finite verb forms.

Very few allophones of consonants are noted, mainly because a small acoustic difference can be phonemic when so many consonants are involved. However, the alveolopalatal labialised fricatives  were sometimes realised as alveolar labialised fricatives , and the uvular ejective stop  was often pronounced as a glottal stop  in the past tense suffix -, due to the influence of the Kabardian and Adyghe languages.

Restrictions on word-final consonants have not yet been investigated; however, Ubykh has a slight preference for open syllables (CV) over closed ones (VC or CVC). The pharyngealised consonants  and  have not been noted word-finally, but this is probably a statistical anomaly due to the rarity of these consonants, each being attested only in a handful of words.

The alveolar trill  is not common in native Ubykh vocabulary, appearing mostly in loan words. However, the phoneme carries a phonaesthetic concept of rolling or a repeated action in a few verbs, notably  ~  ('to roll around') and  ~  ('to slither').

Karacalar Ubykh Phonology 
A divergent dialect of Ubykh spoken by Osman Güngör, an inhabitant of Karacalar in Balıkesir province was investigated by Georges Dumézil in the 1960s. Below is an International Phonetic Alphabet representation of the Karacalar Ubykh consonant inventory.

Güngör's speech differed phonologically from Standard Ubykh in a number of ways:

 the labialised alveolar stops  have merged into the corresponding bilabial stops .
 The labialised alveolopalatal fricatives  have merged with their postalveolar counterparts .
  seems to have disappeared.
 Palatalisation of the uvular consonants is no longer phonemic, also being replaced in many instances by gemination (standard  ('to cough') → Karacalar ).

Vowels 
Ubykh has very few basic phonemic vowels. Other vowels, notably , appear in some loanwords. The question of whether an additional vowel  should be retained is of some debate, since it differs from  not in length but in quality.

Even with so few vowels, there are many vowel allophones, affected by the secondary articulation of the consonants that surround them. Eleven basic phonetic vowels appear, mostly derived from the two phonemic vowels adjacent to labialised or palatalised consonants. In general, the following rules apply:

 and 
 and 
 and 
 and 

Other, more complex vowels have been noted as allophones:  ('you did it') can become , for instance. On occasion, nasal sonorants (particularly ) may even decay into vowel nasality.

The vowel  appears initially very frequently, particularly in the function of the definite article.  is extremely restricted initially, appearing only in ditransitive verb forms where all three arguments are third person, e.g.  ('he gave it to him') (normally ). Even then,  itself may be dropped to provide an even shorter form .

Both vowels appear without restriction finally, although when  is unstressed finally, it tends to be dropped:  ('father') becomes the definite form  ('the father'). This kind of allomorphy is called a zero allomorph.

Notes

References

External links
COCOON archive (COllections de COrpus Oraux Numériques) where several Ubykh stories recorded by Dumézil with French and English translation can be found

Northwest Caucasian phonologies